Big Bend Water District is a government agency that was created in 1983 to service the community of Laughlin, Nevada. It is governed by the Clark County Commission and operated by the Las Vegas Valley Water District. It is a member agency of the Southern Nevada Water Authority.

The district includes the Big Bend Water Treatment Facility which treats and supplies clean water to the 7,500 residents of Laughlin and the tourists who visit its casinos.

External links
 Big Bend page on LVVWD website

1983 establishments in Nevada
Government agencies established in 1983
Government of Clark County, Nevada
Laughlin, Nevada
Water management authorities in the United States